The Mbe Mountains Community Forest is situated in southern Nigeria, and covers 86 km.

Rising to heights of 900m the Mbe Mountains are an important stronghold for the critically endangered Cross River gorilla Gorilla gorilla diehli, as well as a number of other unique species such as the Nigeria-Cameroon chimpanzee Pan troglodytes ellioti, the drill Mandrillus leucophaeus, and the grey-necked rockfowl Picathartes oreas. The Mbe Mountains are surrounded by nine communities with a total population of approximately 10,000 people.

Gallery

References

Protected areas of Nigeria